Northville High School is a public high school located in Northville, Fulton County, New York, U.S.A., and is the only high school operated by the Northville Central School District.

Footnotes

Schools in Fulton County, New York
Public high schools in New York (state)